The Deutsche Bank Players Championship of Europe was an annual 72-hole stroke play professional golf tournament for men. It was last played in Germany and was part of the European Tour schedule. The tournament was founded in 1992 as the Honda Open and acquired the tag of The Players Championship of Europe or TPC of Europe in 1995. It was last played at Gut Kaden. The prize fund in 2007 was €3.6 million, which put it in the top group of European Tour events outside the major championships and World Golf Championships, but not at the head of the list.  

The parallels between this tournament and the PGA Tour's Players Championship are not very strong. The European Players Championship was not the richest event on the European Tour and it was not played close to the Tour's headquarters. The Players Championship's closest parallel in Europe is perhaps the BMW PGA Championship, although that was originally the British PGA Championship, and thus equivalent to the PGA Championship, organised by the PGA of America, which is a major championship and is now a European Tour event.

Before it was attached to the event in Germany, the TPC/Players Championship tag was applied briefly to European Tour events in England and Portugal. It was more of a marketing tool than a genuine indication that the event is different from other leading European Tour events in any important way.

Tiger Woods has played in the tournament several times. He was said to have received large appearance fees, which give rise to some controversy as appearance fees are not normally paid by European Tour events which actually take place in Europe. They are more common in less prestigious tournaments. 

The tournament was dropped from the 2008 European Tour schedule.

Winners

References

External links
Official site
Coverage on the European Tour's official site

Former European Tour events
Golf tournaments in Germany
1992 establishments in Germany
2007 disestablishments in Germany
Recurring sporting events established in 1992
Recurring sporting events disestablished in 2007